Chondroitinase may refer to:
 N-acetylgalactosamine-4-sulfatase, an enzyme
 N-acetylgalactosamine-6-sulfatase, an enzyme
 Chondroitin ABC lyase, an enzyme